Mats Anders Wejsfelt (born 5 December 1980 in Löddeköpinge) is a retired Swedish footballer who last played for Tennis Borussia Berlin.

Club career 
Wejsfelt's first senior club was Helsingborgs IF in 2000. He was in the squad several times, but did not play a match in the Allsvenskan. He moved to second-tier club IFK Malmö where he got into the first team and played in 24 Superettan matches.

In January 2003, Wejsfelt moved to Germany for the first time, spending half a year with SV Babelsberg 03. In June, Wejsfelt moved back to Sweden, where he made six Superettan appearances for Trelleborgs FF. Wejsfelt moved to Germany again in 2004, to NOFV-Oberliga club FC Sachsen Leipzig where he spent the next two years. At the start of the 2006–07 season, Wejsfelt signed for 1. FC Magdeburg who had just been promoted to the third-tier Regionalliga Nord. He quickly became a regular starter for his new club, making 74 league appearances over three seasons, featuring in two DFB-Pokal games too. After three further years at lower-league Saxony-Anhalt teams, he signed for Tennis Borussia Berlin for the 2013–14 season, making 14 appearances and scoring two goals in the first half of the season. After not playing a game in 2014 due to injury, he subsequently retired.

References

External links 
 

1980 births
Living people
People from Kävlinge Municipality
Swedish footballers
Association football defenders
Superettan players
Helsingborgs IF players
IFK Malmö Fotboll players
SV Babelsberg 03 players
Trelleborgs FF players
FC Sachsen Leipzig players
1. FC Magdeburg players
VfB Germania Halberstadt players
Tennis Borussia Berlin players
Swedish expatriate footballers
Expatriate footballers in Germany
Footballers from Skåne County